Mannose-P-dolichol utilization defect 1 protein is a protein that in humans is encoded by the MPDU1 gene.

See also
 Dolichol monophosphate mannose
 Congenital disorder of glycosylation

References

Further reading

External links
  GeneReviews/NCBI/NIH/UW entry on Congenital Disorders of Glycosylation Overview